In the geologic timescale, the Roadian is an age or stage of the Permian. It is the earliest or lower of three subdivisions of the Guadalupian Epoch or Series. It was preceded by the Kungurian and followed by the Wordian.

Stratigraphy
In 1961, the regional timescale used for the southeastern US had the Wordian and Capitanian as subdivisions of the Guadalupian. Efforts to correlate the Permian stratigraphy of the southeastern US with that of Russia led to the conclusion that between the Wordian stage and the Russian Artinskian stage, another stage needed to be introduced. This stage, the Roadian Stage, was established in 1968 and took its name from the Road Canyon Formation in Brewster County, Texas, formerly considered the lower (oldest) part of the Word Formation. The stage was added to the internationally used IUGS timescale in 2001.

The base of the Roadian is defined as the place in the stratigraphic record where fossils of conodont species Jinogondolella nankingensis first appears. The global reference profile for the base (the GSSP) is located in Stratotype Canyon in the Guadalupe Mountains, Texas. The top of the Roadian (the base of the Wordian Stage) is at the first appearance of fossils of conodont species Jinogondolella aserrata.

Biodiversity
Olson’s Extinction, a worldwide loss of terrestrial vertebrate life occurred during the Early Guadalupian (Roadian, Wordian).

References

Literature

External links
GeoWhen Database - Roadian
Upper Paleozoic stratigraphic chart at the website of the subcommission for stratigraphic information of the ICS

 
Permian geochronology
.
Permian geology of Texas